On Oni Pond is the fifth studio album by American band Man Man. It was released in September 2013 under Anti- Records.

Track listing

Personnel

Man Man
Honus Honus - lead vocalist, piano/organ
Pow Pow - drums, percussion, loops, programming

Additional Musicians
Horn arrangements - Adam Schatz
Horns - Brandon Lerbs, Tommy Van Den Berg, Willie Karpf and Andrew Beckstrom
String arrangements - Nate Walcott
Strings - Frank Seligman, Tracy Dunn, Keith Plenert and Phyllis Duncan
Jamey "T. Moth" Robinson - assorted synth squiggles, bass bops, celeste, backing vocals- 2, 3, 4, 5, 8, 9, 10, 13
Adam "Brown Sugar" Schatz - assorted saxophone, keyboards, backing vocals- 1, 2, 3, 4, 6, 9, 10, 11, 13
Mike Mogis - guitar/bass - 2, 3, 4, 6, 8, 9, 10, 11, 13
Susan Sanchez - vocals - 2, 3, 4, 6, 8, 9, 10, 11, 13
A. J. Mogis - upright bass - 3, 5, 6
Kara Nelson - vocals - 2, 6
Nate Walcott - trumpet solo/arrangement - 6

References

2013 albums
Man Man albums
Anti- (record label) albums